Lake Vivi (Russian language: о́зеро Ви́ви) is a lake in Evenkia, Siberia, Russia.

The lake is located in a remote area and has no permanent settlements along its banks. The spot is marked by a 7-metre monument erected in August 1992. Nearby is an even higher cross dedicated to St. Sergius of Radonezh.

Geography

Lake Vivi is located on the southern limit of the Putorana Massif, in the zone where it overlaps with the Syverma Plateau. It is a typical river lake, with the Vivi River, a tributary of the Lower Tunguska, flowing out of it from its southern end.

See also
List of lakes of Russia

References

External links
 Center of Russia

Vivi
Geographical centres